Géo Bernier (Namur, 16 July 1862 – Ixelles, 28 December 1918) was a Belgian painter of landscapes and portraits, but principally of horses. He was also a poster designer.

His artistic talents were discovered early on by Ferdinand Marinus, his drawing teacher in the college of Namur. When he moved to Brussels in 1880, he received an education from Michel Van Alphen, a somewhat lesser-known landscape painter. In 1883, he entered the academy of Brussels, where he received training from the post-romantic painter Jean-François Portaels (painting), Joseph Stallaert (drawing from nature) and Joseph van Severdonck (historical painting).

He joined the "Compagnie brésilienne des Tramways bruxellois" and during this time, he took advanced courses in equine anatomy at the Brussels School of Veterinary Medicine. This opened a pathway to become a specialist in depicting lots of different types of horses. Through his acquaintance with Alfred Madoux, director of the magazine "l'Etoile belge", he was able to make sketches in his stables in Auderghem. To improve his skills even further, he took dissecting classes at the veterinary school in Brussels.

In 1893, he co-founded the art group Le Sillon. Already in their first annual exhibition of 1893, he was named by critics as one of the greatest Belgian animal painters. He also painted a lot of other animals, such as: cows, sheep, pigs, swans, dogs... He was also a great admirer of the animal painter Alfred Verwee.

Throughout the rest of his life, he would spend his time in the world of racing horses and their owners

He was the husband of the artist Jenny Hoppe and father of the composer René Bernier. He and his wife lived together in the Hervormingsstraat 4 in Ixelles, where he also had a exhibition room. This house is now protected by Brussels. He was also a brother of an ephemeral mayor of Saint-Gilles, Fernand Bernier.

Works

Further reading
 G. Van Zype: "Georges Bernier" in Nos peintres, 2nd series, Brussels, 1904, pp. 23–34
 J. Potvin, Géo Bernier, 1926: Le dernier des animaliers. Brussels: SA M. Weissenbruch
 La peinture animalière en Belgique au XIX' siècle, Brussels 1982, pp. 62, 147 et 148, 154, 166
 "Bernier Géo" in Nos Contemporains, Portraits et biographies des personalités belges ou résidant en Belgique, connues par l'œuvre littéraire, artistique ou scientiphique, ou par l'action politique par l'influence morale ou sociale. Brussels 1904, pp. 242–244
 "Bernier-Hoppe Jenny" in Nos Contemporains, Portraits et biographies des personalités belges ou résidant en Belgique, connues par l'œuvre littéraire, artistique ou scientiphique, ou par l'action politique par l'influence morale ou sociale. Brussels 1904, pp. 244–245
P. Piron: De Belgische beeldende kunstenaars uit de 19de en 20ste eeuw (2 delen); Uitgeverij Art in Belgium (1999) 
 Danny Lannoy, Frieda Devinck, Thérèse Thomas, 2007: Impressionisten in Knocke & Heyst (1870-19140. Oostkamp: Stichting Kunstboek

References

External links 
 Géo Bernier 
 Monographie de Saint-Gilles lez-Bruxelles  

1862 births
1918 deaths
People from Namur (province)
19th-century Belgian painters
19th-century Belgian male artists
20th-century Belgian painters
Animal painters
Académie Royale des Beaux-Arts alumni
20th-century Belgian male artists